Patricia Lopez was a general assignment reporter for the CW11 Morning News on New York City's WPIX-TV.

References

New York (state) television reporters
American television journalists
American women television journalists
Year of birth missing (living people)
Living people
21st-century American women